Peter Hal Oakley (born June 28, 1949) is an American professional golfer best known for winning the 2004 Senior British Open, one of the major championships in senior men's professional golf. He is the younger brother of golfer David Oakley.

Early life 
Oakley was born in Panama City, Florida. He got started in the game at age 11 by his mother, who thought a nearby nine-hole course would be a great babysitter for him and his brother David.

Professional career 
Oakley was a long-time club pro in the Philadelphia-Delaware area where he won numerous sectional titles including the Delaware State Open six times and the Shawnee Open six times. He played some on the Nationwide Tour in his forties to prepare himself for the Champions Tour.

The biggest win of his career was his first on the Champions Tour, and came in a major – The 2004 Senior British Open played at Royal Portrush Golf Club in Northern Ireland. Oakley sank a 10-foot par putt on the final hole to win by one stroke and avoid a playoff with Tom Kite and Eduardo Romero. The victory made him only the 10th open qualifier to win a Champions Tour event.

In 2008, he had his best season since 2004, when he finished fifth in the Russian Seniors Open en route to ending the year 29th in the 2008 European Senior Tour Order Of Merit.

Awards, private life 
At the end of the season after his 2004 Senior British Open triumph, Oakley was awarded 2004 European Seniors Tour Rookie of the Year.

Oakley was awarded the Player of the Year for the Philadelphia Section of the PGA of America in 1980, 1984, 1999 and 2000.

His wife has caddied for him in professional tournaments. His son's, Zachary (Zac) and Jeremy Joseph (J.J.), are also golfers. Zac was a three-time All-American at Wesley College, and J.J. played at the University of Delaware. Oakley is a man of strong religious faith. He formerly lived in Lincoln, Delaware and has moved to Palm City, Florida.

Oakley has done some golf course design work. In 2001, he completed and opened (with partner Chris Adkins) a public course in Milton, Delaware, called The Rookery Golf Club.

Professional wins (17)

Regular career wins (14)
1980 Delaware State Open, Shawnee Open
1983 Shawnee Open
1984 Shawnee Open
1986 Delaware State Open, Shawnee Open
1987 Delaware State Open
1989 Philadelphia Open Championship, Delaware State Open
1990 Philadelphia Open Championship
1995 Delaware State Open
1998 Shawnee Open
1999 Shawnee Open
2000 Delaware State Open

Champions Tour wins (1)

Other senior wins (2)
1999 PGA Senior Club Pro Championship
2000 PGA Senior Stroke Play Championship

Results in major championships

CUT = missed the halfway cut
Note: Oakley never played in the Masters Tournament.

Senior major championships

Wins (1)

U.S. national team appearances
PGA Cup: 1994 (winners)

References

External links

American male golfers
PGA Tour Champions golfers
Winners of senior major golf championships
Golf course architects
Golfers from Florida
Golfers from Delaware
People from Panama City, Florida
People from Sussex County, Delaware
1949 births
Living people